The Jewish Sports Hall of Fame may refer to:
The International Jewish Sports Hall of Fame in Netanya, Israel
The National Jewish Museum Sports Hall of Fame in Commack, New York
The Orange County Jewish Sports Hall of Fame at the Merage Jewish Community Center in Irvine, California
The Southern California Jewish Sports Hall of Fame in Beverley Hills, California